Do Fantoosh (Hindi: दो फंटूस) is a 1994 Bollywood film starring Amjad Khan, Shakti Kapoor in title roles, along with Raj Babbar, Sonam, directed by Veerendra and Sikander Bharti. The film started production in 1988 and was delayed after director Veerendra's death. Sikander Bharti stepped in to revive the film and complete it for release in 1994. The film is dedicated to Amjad Khan, who died two years before the film's release.

Cast
Amjad Khan as Bajrang
Shakti Kapoor as Laxman
Raj Babbar as Veerendra
Sonam as Nimmo
Sadashiv Amrapurkar as Shetty

Soundtrack
The songs were composed by Hari–Arjun and penned by Sikandar Bharti.

References

External links

1994 films
1990s Hindi-language films